Harmologa reticularis is a species of moth of the family Tortricidae. It is found in New Zealand.

The wingspan is 16.5–17.5 mm. The forewings are pale orange with leaden-coloured markings within the basal patch. The hindwings are greyish fuscous.

References

Moths described in 1915
Archipini